Facundo González Molino (born 6 July 2003) is a Uruguayan professional footballer who plays as a centre-back for Spanish team Valencia Mestalla.

Club career
As a youth player, González joined the youth academy of Spanish fifth tier side Vista Alegre. In 2019, he joined the youth academy of Valencia in the Spanish La Liga.

International career
González is a Uruguayan youth international. In September 2022, he played for Uruguay under-20 team in Torneo Cuadrangular de Maldonado.

References

External links
 

2003 births
Living people
Footballers from Montevideo
Association football defenders
Uruguayan footballers
Uruguay youth international footballers
Valencia CF Mestalla footballers
Segunda Federación players
Tercera Federación players
Uruguayan expatriate footballers
Uruguayan expatriate sportspeople in Spain
Expatriate footballers in Spain